The Mad Capsule Markets 1997–2004 is third compilation album by The Mad Capsule Markets. This album features a collection of hits from Digidogheadlock to Cistm Konfliqt.... Songs were re-mastered by Takeshi Ueda for the release. Changes include extended intros to Asphalt-Beach and Bit Crusherrrr and an added scream to Scary as the song gets faster. In the UK edition the DVD was included with the disc instead of the two being sold separately as they are in Japan. The DVD features the re-mastered tracks dubbed over the original videos.

Track listing

The Mad Capsule Markets albums
2004 compilation albums